Pyrola  is a genus of evergreen herbaceous plants in the family Ericaceae. Under the old Cronquist system it was placed in its own family Pyrolaceae, but genetic research showed it belonged in the family Ericaceae. The species are commonly known as wintergreen, a name shared with several other related and unrelated plants (see wintergreen for details). They are native to northern temperate and Arctic regions.

They are rather small plants with a rosette of simple orbicular or ovate leaves, with a flower stem bearing generally rather lax racemes of simple white, cream or pink flowers. The immediate distinguishing feature of Pyrola species is the flower style which is often curved, sticks out beyond the petals and is expanded below the stigma which itself is branched into several lobes. To the casual observer the flower appears to have a small bell-clapper sticking out.

Distribution
They are distributed across northern temperate and arctic Europe, Asia and North America. In North America they also occur down the western mountains south to California. Some populations in New England may be introductions by early European settlers.

Reproduction
Pyrolaceae, as part of the Ericales produce pollen in anthers which open by apical pores. The pollen itself is produced in tetrads and is rather sticky. Not surprisingly, wintergreens are insect pollinated, most commonly by flies. The rather large and complex stigma may be an adaptation to ensure that small insects carrying pollen have an attractive landing place. The flowers are produced in the summer and the rather inconspicuous greenish seed capsules are produced in the autumn. The seeds are numerous and very small.

Ecology
Wintergreens prefer damp and shady locations in woods or in dune slacks. They are often rather local in distribution but can be locally common especially in their more northern locations. Occurring often separately from the leaved varieties are the achlorophyllous, leafless forms of one or more of the typed species.  Leaves, if present, can be narrow and reddish.  These are myco-heterotrophs and feed parasitically off of one or more of the local mycelia.  Because of this parasitic action, the viability of the non-photosynthetic pyrola relies on the survival of the supporting mycelium. The pyrola group is one of a select few that can live both photosynthetically or not.  This differentiation is not understood and if deciphered could explain how other obligate non-photosynthetic forest dwelling plants have crossed that evolutionary threshold.

Captain George Vancouver's (1757-1798)botanist Archibald Menzies discovered four new pyrolas near Squirrel Cove, Cortes Island, BC with delicate pink or white flowers often with evergreen leaves. From Desolation Sound by Heather Harbord 1939

Pyrola elliptica
Pyrola elliptica, commonly known as "shinleaf", contains a drug related to aspirin, and the leaves have been used to treat bruises. Its common name derives from its use in shin casting.

References

External links

 
Ericaceae genera
Flora of Europe
Flora of North America
Flora of temperate Asia
Taxa named by Carl Linnaeus